MK13 is a class of fast patrol craft armed with both anti-ship missile and torpedo operated by the Navy of the Islamic Revolutionary Guard Corps.

History 
MK13 ships are probably built in China, and are reportedly in service since 2006.

Design

Dimensions and machinery 
It uses two Trimax 3200 surface drives, powered by two Isotta 1312T2 MSD diesel engines.

Structure 
The monohull body of the MK13-class is made of aluminium.

Armament 
The ships are equipped with two 324mm torpedo tubes, as well as two anti-ship missile launchers with Nasr.

References 

Fast patrol boat classes of the Navy of the Islamic Revolutionary Guard Corps